The Eurasian wren (Troglodytes troglodytes) or northern wren is a very small insectivorous bird, and the only member of the wren family Troglodytidae found in Eurasia and Africa (Maghreb). In Anglophone Europe, it is commonly known simply as the wren. It has a very short tail which is often held erect, a short neck and a relatively long thin bill. It is russet brown above, paler buff-brown below and has a cream buff supercilium. The sexes are alike.

The species was once lumped with Troglodytes hiemalis of eastern North America and Troglodytes pacificus of western North America as the winter wren. The Eurasian wren occurs in Europe and across the Palearctic – including a belt of Asia from northern Iran and Afghanistan across to Japan. It is migratory in only the northern parts of its range. It is also highly polygynous, an unusual mating system for passerines.

The scientific name is taken from the Greek word "troglodytes" (from τρώγλη  "hole", and δῠ́ειν , "creep"), meaning "hole-dweller", and refers to its habit of disappearing into cavities or crevices whilst hunting arthropods or to roost. The taxonomy of the genus Troglodytes is currently unresolved, as recent molecular studies have suggested that  Cistothorus spp. and Thryorchilus spp. are within the clade currently defined by Troglodytes.

Taxonomy
The Eurasian wren was described by the Swedish naturalist Carl Linnaeus in 1758 in the tenth edition of his Systema Naturae under the binomial name Motacilla troglodytes. The specific epithet is from the Ancient Greek  meaning "cave-dweller". In 1555 the German naturalist Conrad Gessner had used the Latin name Passer troglodyte for the Eurasian wren in his Historiae animalium. The species is now placed in the genus Troglodytes that was introduced by the French ornithologist Louis Pierre Vieillot in 1809.

The Eurasian wren was formerly considered conspecific with two North American species: the winter wren (Troglodytes hiemalis) and the Pacific wren (Troglodytes pacificus). Some ornithologists place the Eurasian wren, the winter wren and the Pacific wren in a separate genus Nannus that was introduced by the Swedish naturalist Gustaf Johan Billberg in 1828 with the Eurasian wren as the type species.

It was estimated that Troglodytes pacificus and Troglodytes troglodytes last shared a common ancestor approximately 4.3 million years ago, long before the glacial cycles of the Pleistocene, thought to have promoted speciation in many avian lineages inhabiting the boreal forest of North America.

There are 28 recognised subspecies of this taxonomically complex bird. The disputed subspecies T. t. , the Daito wren, became extinct around 1940 – if it was indeed a valid taxon and not merely based on an anomaly. Thus in Scotland, in addition to the typical bird T. t. indigenus, there are three distinct insular subspecies: one, T. t. hirtensis, is confined to the island of St Kilda; another, T. t. zetlandicus, to the Shetland Islands; and the third, T. t. fridariensis, to Fair Isle. The St Kilda wren is greyer above, whiter beneath, with more abundant bars on the back; the Shetland wren and Fair Isle wren are darker.

Description
The Eurasian wren is a plump, sturdy bird with rounded wings and a short tail, which is usually held cocked up. It is rufous brown above, greyer beneath, and indistinctly barred with darker brown and grey, even on the wings and tail. The bill is dark brown and the legs are pale brown, the feet having strong claws and a large hind toe. Young birds are less distinctly barred and have mottled underparts. The plumage is subject to considerable variation, and where populations have been isolated, the variation has become fixed in one minor form or another.

Vocalizations

The most common call is a sharp, repeated "tic-tic-tic", similar but faster and with less isolated notes compared to that of a robin. When the bird is annoyed or excited, its call runs into an emphatic , not unlike clockwork running down. The song is a gushing burst of sweet music, clear, shrill and emphatic. The male has remarkably long and complex vocalizations, with a series of tinkling trills one after the other for seconds on end. The bird has an enormous voice for its size, ten times louder, weight for weight, than a cockerel. The song begins with a few preliminary notes, then runs into a trill, slightly ascending, and ends in full clear notes or another trill. At any season the song may be heard, though it is most noticeable during spring. Despite its generally mouse-like behaviour, the male may sing from an exposed low perch as its whole body quivers from the effort. Its song may sometimes be confused with that of the dunnock, which has a warble that is shorter and weaker. The wren's song also incorporates repeated trill sounds while the dunnock's does not.

Distribution and habitat

The Eurasian wren is a Palearctic species. The nominate race breeds in Europe as far north as 67°N in Norway and 64°N in Sweden, Finland and Russia. The bird's southern limit is northern Spain, southern France, Italy, Sicily and southern Russia. It also breeds in Western Asia as far east as Syria. It is replaced by other races in Iceland, the Faroe Islands, Shetland, the Hebrides, and St Kilda, and further south in northwestern Africa, Spain and Portugal, the Balearic Islands, Corsica, Sardinia, Crete and Cyprus. Other races also occur in southern Russia and Japan.

It occupies a great variety of habitats, typically any kind of cultivated or uncultivated area with bushes and low ground cover; gardens, hedgerows, thickets, plantations, woodland and reed beds. It inhabits more open locations with clumps of brambles or gorse, rough pasture, moorland, boulder-strewn slopes, rocky coasts and sea cliffs.

Behaviour and ecology

The wren is an ever-active bird, constantly on the move foraging for insects, in the open or among thick vegetation. It moves with quick jerks, probing into crevices, examining old masonry, hopping onto fallen logs and delving down among them. It sometimes moves higher in the canopy, but for the most part stays near the ground, often being flushed from under overhangs on banks. Sometimes it hops up the lower part of tree trunks, behaving like a miniature nuthatch. Occasionally it flits away, its short flights swift and direct but not sustained, its tiny round wings whirring as it flies.

This small, stump-tailed wren is almost as familiar in Europe as the robin. It is mouse-like, easily lost sight of when it is hunting for food, but is found everywhere from the tops of the highest moors to the sea coast.

It is a bird of the uplands even in winter, vanishing into the heather when snow lies thick above, a troglodyte indeed. It frequents gardens and farms, but it is quite as abundant in thick woods and in reed-beds.

At night, usually in winter, it often roosts, true to its scientific name, in dark retreats, snug holes and even old nests. In hard weather, it may do so in parties, consisting of either the family or of many individuals gathered together for warmth.

Breeding

In most of northern Europe and Asia, it nests mostly in coniferous forests, where it is often identified by its long and exuberant song.  Although it is an insectivore, it can remain in moderately cold and even snowy climates by foraging for insects on substrates such as bark and fallen logs. The male wren builds several nests in his territory; these are called "cock nests" but are never lined until the female chooses one to use. The number of nests on a territory influences the female's choice of mate; she preferentially mates with a male that had constructed numerous nests. Courtship includes display and posturing by the male. He sings with wings and tail half open, or with them drooping, sometimes with one wing extended, or the wings may be raised and lowered several times in quick succession.

The neatly-domed nest has a side entrance and is built of grass, moss, lichen and dead leaves, whatever is available locally. It is often tucked into a hole in a wall or tree trunk or a crack in a rock, but it is often built in brambles, a bush or a hedge, among ivy on a bank, in thatch, or in abandoned bird's nests such as those of the house sparrow, swallow, house martin and dipper. On making her selection, the female wren lines the nest generously with feathers.

A clutch of five or six (range three to eleven) eggs are laid from April onwards. These average  and are white with variable amounts of reddish-brown speckles, mostly on the broad end. The female alone incubates these, and they hatch after 14 to 15 days. The young are fed on insects, spiders and other small invertebrates; there is no record of the male feeding the young in the nest, but he does do so after they have fledged, which happens after about 16 days. There are usually two broods.

Wrens are highly polygamous, that is to say a male can have, at any one time, more than one female with an active nest on his territory. An active nest is one in which there are eggs or nestlings. A male has been recorded with four females breeding on his territory. Bigamy and trigamy are the most common forms of polygamy.

Food and feeding
Insects form the bulk of the diet; these are chiefly the larvae of butterflies and moths, such as geometer moths and owlet moths, as well as beetle larvae, fly larvae, caddisfly larvae and aphids. Other dietary items include spiders, and some seeds are also taken. The young are largely fed on moth larvae, with caterpillars of the cabbage moth and crane fly larvae having been identified.

Relationship with humans

In European folklore, the wren is the king of the birds, according to a fable attributed to Aesop by Plutarch, when the eagle and the wren strove to fly the highest, the wren rested on the eagle's back, and when the eagle tired, the wren flew out above him. Thus, Plutarch implied, the wren proved that cleverness is better than strength. The wren's majesty is recognized in such stories as the Grimm Brothers' The Willow-Wren and the Bear. In German, the wren is called Zaunkönig (king of the fence). An old German name was “Schneekönig” (snow king), and in Dutch, it is “winterkoning” (winter king), which all refer to king. In Japan, the wren is labelled king of the winds, and the myth of The Wren Among the Hawks sees the wren successfully hunt a boar that the hawks could not, by flying into its ear and driving it mad.

It was a sacred bird to the Druids, who considered it "king of all birds", and used its musical notes for divination.  The shape-shifting Fairy Queen took the form of a wren, known as "Jenny Wren" in nursery rhymes.  A wren's feather was thought to be a charm against disaster or drowning.

The wren also features in the legend of Saint Stephen, the first Christian martyr, who supposedly was betrayed by the noisy bird as he attempted to hide from his enemies.  Traditionally, St. Stephen's Day (26 December) has been commemorated by Hunting the Wren, wherein young wrenboys would catch the bird and then ritually parade it around town, as described in the traditional "Wren Song". The Wren, the Wren, the king of all birds, St. Stephen's day was caught in the furze. Although he is little, his family's great, I pray you, good landlady, give us a treat. The tradition, and the significance of the wren as a symbol and sacrifice of the old year, is discussed in Sir James Frazer's The Golden Bough.

According to Suetonius, the assassination of Julius Caesar was foretold by an unfortunate wren. On the day before the Ides of March, a wren was seen being pursued in a frenzy by various other birds. With a conspicuous sprig of laurel clamped in its beak, the wren flew desperately into the Roman Senate, but there its pursuers overtook it and tore it to pieces.

Cultural depictions
In The Jungle Book by Rudyard Kipling, Limmershin, the winter wren (actually the Pacific wren), who was once thought of as the same species as the Eurasian wren, is the narrator of "The White Seal" story.
Wrens have been featured on stamps from Albania, Alderney, Belarus, Belgium, Bulgaria, Faroe Islands, France, Germany, Britain, Guernsey, Hungary, Iceland, Ireland, Isle of Man, Jersey, Netherlands, San Marino, the United States of America, and The Vatican.
The Wren is one of the animals of the Celtic zodiac.
The old British farthing coin featured a wren on the reverse side from 1937 to 1960. The wren was chosen because it was thought of as Britain's smallest bird.

References

Sources

Further reading

External links

RSPB wren page
BBC Sounds wren as "Tweet of the Day"
Birds of Britain wren page
Stamps (for 19 issues) with range map
Videos, photos and sounds – Internet Bird Collection
Ageing and sexing by Javier Blasco-Zumeta & Gerd-Michael Heinze

Troglodytes (bird)
Birds of Eurasia
Birds described in 1758
Articles containing video clips
Taxa named by Carl Linnaeus